Peter Desaga was a German instrument maker at the University of Heidelberg who worked with Robert Bunsen.  In 1855, Desaga perfected an earlier design of the laboratory burner by Michael Faraday into the Bunsen burner.

Neither Desaga nor Bunsen patented the design, and many imitations were marketed.

The Bunsen burner was essential to the invention of the spectroscope by Robert Bunsen and Gustav Kirchhoff.

Peter Desaga's son, Carl Desaga, founded C. Desaga.

Notes

References
 Douglas Allchin writing for SHiPS, University of Minnesota. In the Shadows of Giants - remarks on "the tradition of professional credit". Retrieved June 6, 2005.
 Williams, Kathryn R., A Burning Issue. J. Chem. Educ. 2000, 77, 558–559.
 Russell, Colin A., Bunsen without his burner. Phys. Educ. 1999, 34 321-326; 
Royal Society of Chemistry: Chemistry World, Oct 2007 Issue. http://www.rsc.org/chemistryworld/Issues/2007/October/ClassicKitBunsenBurner.asp
Retrieved November 9, 2011.

Year of death missing
Technicians
Year of birth missing